is a Japanese rower. He competed in the men's lightweight coxless four event at the 2000 Summer Olympics.

References

1973 births
Living people
Japanese male rowers
Olympic rowers of Japan
Rowers at the 2000 Summer Olympics
Sportspeople from Osaka Prefecture
Rowers at the 2002 Asian Games
Asian Games competitors for Japan